The 1970 NAIA Division II football season was the 15th season of college football sponsored by the NAIA and the first season of play of the NAIA's lower division for football. Prior to the season, the NAIA split its football competition into two separate championships: Divisions I and II.

The season was played from August to November 1970 and culminated in the 1970 NAIA Division II Football National Championship, played on December 13, 1970 at Taggert Stadium in New Castle, Pennsylvania .

Westminster (PA) defeated  in the championship game, 21–16, to win their first NAIA national title.

Conference standings

Postseason

See also
 1970 NAIA Division I football season
 1970 NCAA University Division football season
 1970 NCAA College Division football season

References

 
NAIA Football National Championship